Joseph's Gift is a 1998 feature film. It is a modern-day retelling of the biblical story of Joseph, son of Jacob.

Plot
The Keller family are the owners of a successful garment business based in Los Angeles, California. The story mainly revolves around Jacob Keller's (John Saxon) youngest son Joseph (Freddy Rodriguez). Because Jacob treats Joseph as if he is his favorite son, Joseph's brothers Ashton, Simon, and Robert plot to eliminate Joseph. They accomplish this by going on a business trip with Joseph, only to have him kidnapped and taken to a sweat shop run by sadist Frank Childress (Brion James).

After trying to escape from the sweat shop, Joseph is beaten up by Frank's right-hand man Thompsonn (Martin Kove) and put in a small prison-like cell. However, Joseph is given a chance by Frank to work in his office. Joseph's business savvy helps Frank's business, and soon Frank introduces Joseph to his wife Clara (Caroline Ambrose). Clara attempts to come on to Joseph, but Joseph rejects her advances. Enraged, Clara false claims that Joseph is coming on to her. Frank manages to overhear Clara's claims, and he has Joseph shipped off to an insane asylum.

While in the asylum, Joseph becomes acquainted with other inmates, notably Parker (John Dennis Johnston). The two strike up an instant friendship. Eventually, Joseph is released from the asylum and promises to Parker that he will get him out one day.

After leaving the asylum, Joseph gets a job at a bank and manages to get a very prestigious position in a short matter of time. Not forgetting his old friend, Joseph manages to get Parker a respectable job in the bank. Around this time, his long-lost family is in need of a bank loan in order to keep their garment business alive. Jacob's three eldest sons go to the bank and attempt to get a loan. Unbeknownst to them, they are to be in the same room with their long-lost brother Joseph. When Joseph asks what their name is, they tell him their name is Keller and he realizes that they are his long-lost family, but he does not reveal this to them. He tells them that the deal will not be considered unless their father Jacob came there in person.

A few weeks later, the three Keller boys come back to the bank, this time accompanied by Jacob. However, Joseph still does not reveal who he is.

Finally, Joseph comes to the Keller home to finalize the deal during a family dinner. Before the deal can be finalized, Joseph reveals to Jacob that he is his long-lost son Joseph Keller. After a tear-filled reunion, the entire Keller family rejoices in the fact that their family is once again complete.

Cast
Freddy Rodríguez.....Joseph Keller
Brion James.....Frank Childress
Robert Townsend.....James Saunders
John Saxon.....Jacob Keller
Pamela Bellwood.....Rachel Keller
Martin Kove.....Thompsonn
Angus Macfadyen.....Carl
Ben Bottoms.....Ashton Keller
Joseph Bottoms.....Simon Keller
Sam Bottoms.....Robert Keller
John Dennis Johnston.....Parker (credited as J.D. Johnston)
David Arrow.....Justin Keller
Caroline Ambrose.....Clara Childress
Marcel Marceau.....The Snake
Allelon Ruggiero.....Grant Keller

References

External links
 
 
 

1998 films
Films based on the Book of Genesis
Films directed by Philippe Mora
Films scored by Joseph Bishara
Films set in Los Angeles
1990s English-language films
American drama films
1990s American films